Guillermo Alcaide Justel (born 27 May 1986)  is a Spanish professional tennis player.

Tour tournament finals

Titles (5)

References

External links
 
 

1986 births
Living people
Tennis players from Madrid
Spanish male tennis players
21st-century Spanish people